The  is an annual road running competition which takes place in early February in Marugame, Japan. It currently holds IAAF Silver Label Road Race status and the professional races attract over 1000 entries each year, and hosted by the Sankei Shimbun, Sankei Sports, Okayama Broadcasting, BS Fuji.

The race in Marugame was first held in 1947 as a full-length marathon, known as the Kagawa Marathon. A companion 20 km race began in 1949 in addition to the scheduled marathon. The course lengths were gradually reduced over time: the main race lasted as a full marathon until 1961 when a 35 km race was held and the shorter race became a 10 km competition. The main race was again shortened in 1971, being reduced to a 20 km race. The competitions were known as the Kagawa Road Races until 1997, when the main race was slightly extended to the half marathon distance and the competition received its current moniker.

Competitors in the professional races are largely Japanese athletes, supplemented by African athletes based in the country. In addition, a small number of foreign athletes are invited to compete each year. The level of competition is strong: Kenyan runner Mekubo Mogusu recorded a sub-60 minute time in 2007 for the men's course record (59:48), while the women's course record of 1:07:26, set by Kayoko Fukushi in 2006, is the Asian record for the half marathon. The course is AIMS-certified making performances at the course eligible for national and world records.

The course of the half marathon is largely linear, beginning at the Marugame Stadium and heading eastwards before abruptly looping back to follow the same path back towards the finish point within the stadium.

Past winners

Early distances
Key:

Half marathon
Key:

Statistics
Note: All statistics apply to international half marathon only

Winners by country

Multiple winners

See also
 Tokyo Marathon
 Osaka International Ladies Marathon (Osaka Women's Marathon)
 Sankei Shimbun - daily newspaper in Japan
 Okayama Broadcasting.
 Fujisankei Communications Group -  Sankei Shimbun and Fuji Television, the largest media conglomerate in Japan

References

External links
Official website 

Half marathons
Road running competitions in Japan
Recurring sporting events established in 1947
Fujisankei Communications Group
Sports competitions in Kagawa Prefecture
Marugame, Kagawa